The 2009–10 Baylor Bears basketball team represented Baylor University in the 2009–10 NCAA Division I men's basketball season. This was head coach Scott Drew's seventh season at Baylor. The Bears compete in the Big 12 Conference and played their home games at the Ferrell Center. They advanced to the semifinals of the 2010 Big 12 men's basketball tournament before losing to Kansas State. They received an at–large bid to the 2010 NCAA Division I men's basketball tournament, earning a #3 seed in the South Region. Their first round win over #14 seed Sam Houston State was the school's first tournament win since 1950. They defeated #11 seed Old Dominion in second round to advance to the Sweet Sixteen for the first time in school history. They extended their record breaking run by defeating #10 seed Saint Mary's to advance to the Elite Eight where they would fall to #1 seed and AP #3 Duke. They finished the season with a record of 28–8, the 28 wins is a school record.

Pre-season
In the Big 12 preseason polls, released October 14, Baylor was selected to finish tenth in the Big 12 coaches poll.

Roster
Source

Schedule and results
Source
All times are Central

|-
!colspan=9| Exhibition

|-
!colspan=9| Regular Season

|-
!colspan=10| 2010 Big 12 men's basketball tournament

|-
!colspan=10| 2010 NCAA Division I men's basketball tournament

All Conference
Lacedarius Dunn was named to the All-Big 12 2nd team. Ekpe Udoh and Tweety Carter were named to the All-Big 12 3rd team after the season.

Rankings

*AP does not release post-NCAA Tournament rankings^Coaches did not release a Week 2 poll.

References

Baylor
Baylor
Baylor Bears men's basketball seasons